Lars Hedlund (January 24, 1949 – June 4, 2016), was a former strongman and powerlifter from Sweden.

Strongman
Lars competed in three World's Strongest Man contests, finishing second at the 1979 and 1980 World's Strongest Man, and third in 1978. Lars also won Europe's Strongest Man in 1981.

Powerlifting
Lars was a European Powerlifting champion in 1980, and the Scandinavian Powerlifting champion in 1979. He competed twice at the IPF World Powerlifting Championships in 1977 finishing 6th, and in 1979 finishing third. Lars set numerous bench press world records throughout his powerlifting career, his best lift was  raw in 1980 in Copenhagen, Denmark.

Honours
3rd place 1978 World's Strongest Man
2nd place 1979 World's Strongest Man
2nd  place 1980 World's Strongest Man
1st place 1981 Europe's Strongest Man

See also
 List of strongmen

References

External links
 Strongestman.billhenderson.org

Swedish strength athletes
Swedish powerlifters
1949 births
2016 deaths